Waren may refer to:

Waren (Müritz) a town and climatic spa in the state of Mecklenburg-Vorpommern, Germany
Waren (port), a seaport in Northumberland, England